United Irelander is the name of both an Irish political blog as well as the blog's author, who goes by the same name. The site originated in December 2004 and as the name suggests, deals primarily with Irish nationalism and advocating a united Ireland. As a result, it attracts comment from people across various backgrounds in Ireland as well as overseas. The author resides in Dublin, Ireland and argues for a united Ireland based on consent.

Blog features

The site has a unique "Words on Wednesday" feature which sees various political figures in Ireland being interviewed on a wide range of topics including how they got involved in politics and their thoughts on Irish unity. Some of the figures already interviewed include Labour leader Pat Rabbitte, Senator David Norris and Polish Ambassador to Ireland Witold Sobkow. With the 2007 General Election approaching, several TDs have been interviewed including Labour's Tommy Broughan, Sinn Féin's Arthur Morgan and Independent Tony Gregory.

Awards

The site made the five-strong shortlist for Best Political Blog in the inaugural Irish Blog Awards. It lost out to Slugger O'Toole.

United Irelander also contributed to the Irish Election blog which won Best Politics Blog and Best News and Current Affairs Blog at the 2007 Irish Blog Awards.

There have been several mentions of the site too in various newspapers, such as the Sunday Tribune.

Footnotes

External links
United Irelander
The Nationalist

Irish bloggers
2004 establishments in Ireland